Salticus peckhamae is a species of jumping spider. It is found in the United States.

References

Salticidae
Endemic fauna of the United States
Spiders of the United States
Spiders described in 1897